The Ciudad Juárez Mexico Temple is the 71st operating temple of the Church of Jesus Christ of Latter-day Saints (LDS Church).

The Ciudad Juárez Mexico Temple is located in the border city of Ciudad Juárez, Chihuahua, and serves about 12,000 church members in northern Mexico and the adjacent U.S. state of Texas.

History
About 1,700 members attended the groundbreaking ceremony on January 9, 1999, and after the temple was completed over 25,000 people attended a week-long open house. LDS Church president Gordon B. Hinckley dedicated the Ciudad Juárez Temple on February 26–27, 2000, and the dedication ceremonies were attended by approximately 8,100 members from El Paso and Juarez.

In 2020, the Ciudad Juárez Mexico Temple was closed in response to the coronavirus pandemic.

See also

 Comparison of temples of The Church of Jesus Christ of Latter-day Saints
 List of temples of The Church of Jesus Christ of Latter-day Saints
 List of temples of The Church of Jesus Christ of Latter-day Saints by geographic region
 Temple architecture (Latter-day Saints)
 The Church of Jesus Christ of Latter-day Saints in Mexico
 The Church of Jesus Christ of Latter-day Saints in Texas

References

External links
 
São Paulo Brazil Temple Official site
São Paulo Brazil Temple at ChurchofJesusChristTemples.org

20th-century Latter Day Saint temples
Buildings and structures in Chihuahua (state)
Temples (LDS Church) completed in 2000
Temples (LDS Church) in Mexico
2000 establishments in Mexico